Hampton Manor is a census-designated place in the town of East Greenbush in Rensselaer County, New York, United States. The population was 2,417 at the 2010 census.

Hampton Manor is a suburb of the cities of Rensselaer and Albany. Many of the homes built in Hampton Manor were kit houses from Sears Roebuck and Montgomery Ward.

Geography
Hampton Manor is located at  (42.618846, -73.725704).

Demographics

As of the census of 2000, there were 2,525 people, 1,040 households, and 690 families residing in the CDP. The population density was 4,002.3 per square mile (1,547.5/km2). There were 1,079 housing units at an average density of 1,710.3/sq mi (661.3/km2). The racial makeup of the CDP was 95.37% White, 1.70% African American, 0.16% Native American, 1.70% Asian, 0.12% from other races, and 0.95% from two or more races. Hispanic or Latino of any race were 0.71% of the population.

There were 1,040 households, out of which 32.8% had children under the age of 18 living with them, 48.6% were married couples living together, 13.6% had a female householder with no husband present, and 33.6% were non-families. 28.9% of all households were made up of individuals, and 10.6% had someone living alone who was 65 years of age or older. The average household size was 2.40 and the average family size was 2.97.

In the CDP, the population was spread out, with 24.8% under the age of 18, 5.0% from 18 to 24, 32.1% from 25 to 44, 22.8% from 45 to 64, and 15.3% who were 65 years of age or older. The median age was 39 years. For every 100 females, there were 91.9 males. For every 100 females age 18 and over, there were 86.5 males.

The median income for a household in the CDP was $42,794, and the median income for a family was $46,818. Males had a median income of $32,022 versus $30,694 for females. The per capita income for the CDP was $21,589. None of the families and 1.3% of the population were living below the poverty line, including no under eighteens and 4.8% of those over 64.

References

External links
 "Hampton Manor history articles"

Census-designated places in New York (state)
Census-designated places in Rensselaer County, New York